A referendum on establishing a Constituent Assembly to write the new constitution was held in Ecuador on 15 April 2007. After its approval by 87% of voters, a Constituent Assembly Election was held on 30 September 2007 with Correa's PAIS Alliance taking the majority of seats. The assembly was to sit for a maximum of 180 days with a possible 60-day-extension.

Background
The referendum was called by President Rafael Correa on 15 January 2007, and was originally planned to be held on 18 March 2007. On 23 January 2007, the Electoral Court decided to send the referendum call to Congress for consideration, which later approved it in a vote that was boycotted by a large number of parliamentarians. A poll taken in January showed 70% of voters to be in favour of the proposal.

Results

References

2007 referendums
Constituent Assembly referendum
2007 elections in South America
Referendums in Ecuador